Radaniara is a  village in Sri Lanka. It is located within Southern Province. It is situated in Mulkirigalala electorate and the nearest town is Walasmulla. It is a village having 200 families. A road to the village runs through to Namaneliya.

Geography
Plat lands and northern side Mapitakanda rainforest and southern side has mixed crops, coconut, paddy fields, and cinnamon.

Economy

Many people are manual labourers. quarter of families belongs many lands of village. During rainy season many men and women engage in paddy fields. Many men work in the capital and return home on weekends or at end of months.

Education and educated people

H/radaniaara maha vidyalaya is situated in center of village and was established around 1950. Many elderly people are old mates of school. It holds from grade one to thirteen. Secondary education is available in Art stream and those who want to seek Bioscience, Mathematics or commerce fields go to nearby cities Walasmulla or Weeraketiya. Kankanam palliyage saman allied with Sinha Saman Kumara is the leading politician who got selected as a member of southern provincial council from UPFA government. Dr. Patabendige Chaminda is the first MBBS graduated doctor who got primary education from school and Dr. Prabash Karunanayake is the first MBBS graduated doctor who was born in village.

Ancestry

One-third of lands belonged to the Ihalahawatta family in 1900. Two landloads were Mr. Kankanam Palliyage Samiappu and Mr. Karunanayake [loku ralahamy]. Many dependents of the Samiappu family live scattered in the village. Several new families emerged in 2000 and afterwards. Lands for school was donated by Mr. lokuralahamy's family and the main Buddhist temple of village, Sri Sudarmaramaya, land was donated by Mr. Samiappu and his wife Mrs. Jasinhe Lokuhamy. Many lands taken into government control in Sirimavo Bandaranayake government and many were distributed among villagers in later periods. Many belong to Halagama caste and few Govigama families. Namaneliya and Buwellagoda are nearby village in caste of Olee and Hinna respectively and they consider as low castes. Many villagers consider as an insult to family and village if one marries lower caste.

See also
List of settlements in Southern Province, Sri Lanka

External links

Populated places in Southern Province, Sri Lanka